In finance, the Sharpe ratio (also known as the Sharpe index, the Sharpe measure, and the reward-to-variability ratio) measures the performance of an investment such as a security or portfolio compared to a risk-free asset, after adjusting for its risk. It is defined as the difference between the returns of the investment and the risk-free return, divided by the standard deviation of the investment returns. It represents the additional amount of return that an investor receives per unit of increase in risk.

It was named after William F. Sharpe, who developed it in 1966.

Definition
Since its revision by the original author, William Sharpe, in 1994, the ex-ante Sharpe ratio is defined as:

 

The ex-post Sharpe ratio uses the same equation as the one above but with realized returns of the asset and benchmark rather than expected returns; see the second example below.

The information ratio is a generalization of the Sharpe ratio that uses as benchmark some other, typically risky index rather than using risk-free returns.

Use in finance
The Sharpe ratio seeks to characterize how well the return of an asset compensates the investor for the risk taken.  When comparing two assets, the one with a higher Sharpe ratio appears to provide better return for the same risk, which is usually attractive to investors.

However, financial assets are often not normally distributed, so that standard deviation does not capture all aspects of risk.  Ponzi schemes, for example, will have a high empirical Sharpe ratio until they fail. Similarly, a fund that sells low-strike put options will have a high empirical Sharpe ratio until one of those puts is exercised, creating a large loss. In both cases, the empirical standard deviation before failure gives no real indication of the size of the risk being run.

Even in less extreme cases, a reliable empirical estimate of Sharpe ratio still requires the collection of return data over sufficient period for all aspects of the strategy returns to be observed. For example, data must be taken over decades if the algorithm sells an insurance that involves a high liability payout once every 5–10 years, and a high-frequency trading algorithm may only require a week of data if each trade occurs every 50 milliseconds, with care taken toward risk from unexpected but rare results that such testing did not capture (see flash crash).

Additionally, when examining the investment performance of assets with smoothing of returns (such as with-profits funds), the Sharpe ratio should be derived from the performance of the underlying assets rather than the fund returns (Such a model would invalidate the aforementioned Ponzi scheme, as desired).

Sharpe ratios, along with Treynor ratios and Jensen's alphas, are often used to rank the performance of portfolio or mutual fund managers.  Berkshire Hathaway had a Sharpe ratio of 0.76 for the period 1976 to 2011, higher than any other stock or mutual fund with a history of more than 30 years. The stock market had a Sharpe ratio of 0.39 for the same period.

Tests
Several statistical tests of the Sharpe ratio have been proposed. These include those proposed by Jobson & Korkie and Gibbons, Ross & Shanken.

History
In 1952, Arthur D. Roy suggested maximizing the ratio "(m-d)/σ", where m is expected gross return, d is some "disaster level" (a.k.a., minimum acceptable return, or MAR) and σ is standard deviation of returns. This ratio is just the Sharpe ratio, only using minimum acceptable return instead of the risk-free rate in the numerator, and using standard deviation of returns instead of standard deviation of excess returns in the denominator. Roy's ratio is also related to the Sortino ratio, which also uses MAR in the numerator, but uses a different standard deviation (semi/downside deviation) in the denominator.

In 1966, William F. Sharpe developed what is now known as the Sharpe ratio. Sharpe originally called it the "reward-to-variability" ratio before it began being called the Sharpe ratio by later academics and financial operators. The definition was:

Sharpe's 1994 revision acknowledged that the basis of comparison should be an applicable benchmark, which changes with time. After this revision, the definition is:

Note, if Rf is a constant risk-free return throughout the period,

Recently, the (original) Sharpe ratio has often been challenged with regard to its appropriateness as a fund performance measure during evaluation periods of declining markets.

Examples
Example 1

Suppose the asset has an expected return of 15% in excess of the risk free rate. We typically do not know if the asset will have this return. We estimate the risk of the asset, defined as standard deviation of the asset's excess return, as 10%. The risk-free return is constant. Then the Sharpe ratio (using the old definition) will be

Example 2

Suppose that someone currently is invested in a portfolio with an expected return of 12% and a standard deviation of 10%. The risk-free rate of interest is 5%. What is the Sharpe ratio?

The Sharpe ratio is:

Strengths and weaknesses

A negative Sharpe ratio means the portfolio has underperformed its benchmark. All other things being equal, an investor typically prefers a higher positive Sharpe ratio as it has either higher returns or lower volatility. However, a negative Sharpe ratio can be made higher by either increasing returns (a good thing) or increasing volatility (a bad thing). Thus, for negative values the Sharpe ratio does not correspond well to typical investor utility functions.

The Sharpe ratio is convenient because it can be calculated purely from any observed series of returns without need for additional information surrounding the source of profitability. However, this makes it vulnerable to manipulation if opportunities exist for smoothing or discretionary pricing of illiquid assets. Statistics such as the bias ratio and first order autocorrelation are sometimes used to indicate the potential presence of these problems.

While the Treynor ratio considers only the systematic risk of a portfolio, the Sharpe ratio considers both systematic and idiosyncratic risks. Which one is more relevant will depend on the portfolio context.

The returns measured can be of any frequency (i.e. daily, weekly, monthly or annually), as long as they are normally distributed, as the returns can always be annualized. Herein lies the underlying weakness of the ratio - asset returns are not normally distributed. Abnormalities like kurtosis, fatter tails and higher peaks, or skewness on the distribution can be problematic for the ratio, as standard deviation doesn't have the same effectiveness when these problems exist.

Because it is a dimensionless ratio, laypeople find it difficult to interpret Sharpe ratios of different investments. For example, how much better is an investment with a Sharpe ratio of 0.5 than one with a Sharpe ratio of -0.2? This weakness was well addressed by the development of the Modigliani risk-adjusted performance measure, which is in units of percent return – universally understandable by virtually all investors.

In some settings, the Kelly criterion can be used to convert the Sharpe ratio into a rate of return. The Kelly criterion gives the ideal size of the investment, which when adjusted by the period and expected rate of return per unit, gives a rate of return.

The accuracy of Sharpe ratio estimators hinges on the statistical properties of returns, and these properties can vary considerably among strategies, portfolios, and over time.

Drawback as fund selection criteria
Bailey and López de Prado (2012) show that Sharpe ratios tend to be overstated in the case of hedge funds with short track records. These authors propose a probabilistic version of the Sharpe ratio that takes into account the asymmetry and fat-tails of the returns' distribution. With regards to the selection of portfolio managers on the basis of their Sharpe ratios, these authors have proposed a Sharpe ratio indifference curve This curve illustrates the fact that it is efficient to hire portfolio managers with low and even negative Sharpe ratios, as long as their correlation to the other portfolio managers is sufficiently low.

Goetzmann, Ingersoll, Spiegel, and Welch (2002) determined that the best strategy to maximize a portfolio's Sharpe ratio, when both securities and options contracts on these securities are available for investment, is a portfolio of selling one out-of-the-money call and selling one out-of-the-money put. This portfolio generates an immediate positive payoff, has a large probability of generating modestly high returns, and has a small probability of generating huge losses. Shah (2014) observed that such a portfolio is not suitable for many investors, but fund sponsors who select fund managers primarily based on the Sharpe ratio will give incentives for fund managers to adopt such a strategy.

See also
 Bias ratio
 Calmar ratio
 Capital asset pricing model
 Coefficient of variation
 Hansen–Jagannathan bound
 Information ratio
 Jensen's alpha
 List of financial performance measures
 Modern portfolio theory
 Omega ratio
 Risk adjusted return on capital
 Roy's safety-first criterion
 Signal-to-noise ratio
 Sortino ratio
 Sterling ratio
 Treynor ratio
 Upside potential ratio
 V2 ratio
 Z score

References

 .

Further reading
 Lo, Andrew W. "The statistics of Sharpe ratios." Financial analysts journal 58.4 (2002): 36-52 https://doi.org/10.2469/faj.v58.n4.2453
 Bacon Practical Portfolio Performance Measurement and Attribution 2nd Ed: Wiley, 2008. 
 Bruce J. Feibel. Investment Performance Measurement. New York: Wiley, 2003.

External links
 The Sharpe ratio
 Generalized Sharpe Ratio
 All Hail the Sharpe Ratio - Uses and abuses of the Sharpe Ratio
 What is a good Sharpe Ratio? - Some example calculations of Sharpe ratios
 
 What is a good Sharpe Ratio? - Some example calculations of Sharpe ratios
 Sharpe ratio in MS excel - Risk adjusted return calculations
 Calculating and Interpreting Sharpe Ratios online - Cloud calculator

Financial ratios
Statistical ratios
Portfolio theories
Yield (finance)